The former P&O Building is a heritage-listed building in Perth, Western Australia.

Site history
The site of the building formerly housed three separate shops at 56, 58 and 60 William Street.

Architecture
The building was designed in the Inter-war Functionalist style by Waldie Forbes of the Hobbs Smith & Forbes architecture firm.

References

State Register of Heritage Places in the City of Perth
Functionalist architecture